Helsingfors Segelsällskap r.f. (HSS), Helsinki Sailing Society, is the second oldest yacht club in Helsinki, established in 1893. The yacht club has 1000+ members and mainly sail boats in the register. The club is located on Liuskasaari island in the middle of southern Helsinki. Liuskasaari is a few minutes ferry ride away from Merisatamanranta. HSS hosts a popular full service guest harbor for 20 boats. The club also has a substantial contingent of expat sailors residing in Helsinki.

The Largest Classic Fleet in the Nordics
Helsingfors Segelsällskap is renowned for its eighty boats strong classic fleet and its AUDI HSS Match Racing Centre and frequent sailing competitions. The classic fleet consists of yachts mainly in the Metre boat classes. The club has a large fleet of 8 mR, 6 mR, 5.5 Metre and 5 Metre boats as well as Skerry cruisers, Folk Boats, Classic Dragons, Hai boats and classic Cruising yachts. The club is an active partner of the Scandinavian Classic Yacht Trust SCYT, that organizes the Baltic Classic Masters regatta circuit. The regattas are at the present organized in Trosa in Sweden and in Hanko and Helsinki in Finland. In the future classic regattas in Mariehamn, Åland, and Kotka Finland as well as St.Petersburg, Russia, are planned. The HSS classics are organized within the HSS Classic Yacht Committee (CYC).

The Leading Junior Club in Finland
HSS has a very active junior section with sailors between five and fifteen years of age. HSS juniors have a record number of qualified Finnish World Champion representatives. HSS was elected the junior club of the year in 2011 and the Finnish Yacht Club of the Year in 2013, mainly due to its junior program.

AUDI HSS Sailing Center
In 2009 HSS launched an olympic match race center with a fleet of 6 Elliott 6m boats. The HSS Audi Match Race Team Finland headed by Silja Lehtinen won a bronze medal for the club in the London Summer Olympics. The Finnish Olympic success in sailing gave a boost to the center and the name was changed to AUDI HSS Sailing Center in 2012 because of the increased interest in both match and fleet racing among the members. The centre also has a fleet of 8 Laser 16 boats. The center acquired the sparring boats for the Swedish 2003 and 2007 challenger team for the America's Cup – Victory Challenge – SM 40s in 2010. The centre also has six 606s. The center runs an extensive sailing program for adults. HSS has a long tradition in small keel boat racing. The H-boat class was initiated by the club in 1967 and constructed by HSS member Hans Groop. Earlier, in the 1930s, the club had initiated an early one-design – the Hai-boat in the early 1930s. Both classes eventually grew to become the biggest in competitive Finnish sailing during their heyday in the 1950s and the 1980s.

References

External links
 
 
HSS Club House Restaurant Boat House
HSS Racing FB pages
HSS FB pages
HSS Junior Facebook pages
HSS Classic Yacht Committee FB pages
HSS Match Race Centerin FB pages
HSS Social FB pages

HSS on Youtube
 HSS Classic Baltic Masters part 1 (In Finnish
 HSS Classic Baltic Masters part 2 (In Finnish)
 Silja Lehtinen training at HSS Match Race Center

Sports organizations established in 1893
Yacht clubs in Finland
Buildings and structures in Helsinki
Organisations based in Helsinki
Sports clubs in Helsinki
1893 establishments in Finland